Gatteville-le-Phare is a commune in the Manche department in north-western France.

See also
Communes of the Manche department
Antipodes Islands, the exact antipodes of Gatteville-le-Phare

References

Gattevillelephare